Kyung-hee, also spelled Kyong-hui or Gyong-hui, is a Korean unisex given name. The meaning differs based on the hanja used to write each syllable of the name. There are 54 hanja with the reading "kyung" and 25 hanja with the reading "hee" on the South Korean government's official list of hanja which may be registered for use in given names. Kyung-hee was the ninth-most popular name for baby girls in South Korea in 1950, rising to third place by 1960.

People with this name include:

Arts and entertainment
Hong Kyung-hee (born 1954), South Korean sculptor
Lee Kyung-hee (born 1969), South Korean television screenwriter
Grace Lee (Korean name Lee Kyung-hee; born 1982), South Korean television host in the Philippines
Kyeong-Hee Choi, South Korean-born American literature professor

Sport
Lee Gyeong-hui (born 1958), South Korean speed skater
Choi Kyung-hee (born 1966), South Korean basketball player
Li Gyong-hui (cross-country skier) (born 1967), North Korean skier
Yang Gyeong-hui (born 1971), South Korean sprinter
Li Gyong-hui (born 1972), North Korean gymnast
Yang Kyong-hui (born 1978), North Korean football defender
Choi Gyeong-hui (born 1981), South Korean long-distance runner who competed at the 2004 Summer Olympics
Lim Kyung-hee (born 1982), South Korean long-distance runner who competed at the 2012 Summer Olympics
Jon Kyong-hui (born 1986), North Korean long-distance runner

Other
Kim Kyong-hui (born 1946), North Korean politician, younger sister of Kim Jong-il

Fictional characters
Kim Gyeong-hui, in 2002 South Korean film Lovers' Concerto
Do Kyung-hee, played by Kim Ji-min, is the younger sister of lead male Do Kyung-seok, played by Cha Eun-woo, in 2018 South Korean television series Gangnam Beauty

See also
List of Korean given names

References

Korean unisex given names